Turks in Spain, refers to ethnic Turks who have emigrated to Spain as well as the growing Spanish-born community with full or partial Turkish origins. The Turkish Spanish community includes descendants who originate from the Republic of Turkey as well as other post-Ottoman modern nation-states, especially ethnic Turkish communities from the Balkans (e.g. Bulgaria and Romania), and to a lesser extent from the island of Cyprus, and other parts of the Levant.

History

Turkish migration from Turkey

Turkish migration from the Balkans

Bulgaria

The migration waves of Turkish Bulgarians to Spain began as early as the late  1980s. It was a consequence of the ongoing “Revival Process” under communist rule (1984-1989). The aggressive Bulgarisation policies pursued by the communist rule was met with resistance by the Turkish population with many sent to prison or the Belene labour camp and then extradited from Bulgaria; consequently, many Turkish Bulgarians fled to Turkey and Western Europe, including Spain. Since the early 2000s, there has been a significant increase in the number of citizens from Bulgaria who have emigrated to Spain. Among these immigrants are ethnic Turkish Bulgarians who, alongside ethnic Bulgarians (as well as Pomaks, Armenians and other minority groups), have settled in Catalonia, Madrid, Alicante and Valencia.

Romania

Between 2002 and 2011 there was a significant decrease in the population of the Turkish Romanian minority group due to the admission of Romania into the European Union and the subsequent relaxation of the travelling and migration regulations. Hence, Turkish Romanians, especially from the Dobruja region, have joined other Romanian citizens (e.g. ethnic Romanians, Tatars, etc.) in migrating mostly to Spain, Germany, Austria, Italy, and the UK.

Turkish migration from the diaspora

There has also been ethnic Turkish migration to Spain from the modern Turkish diaspora, most notably British Turks and German Turks who have arrived in Spain as British and German citizens.

Demographics
The majority of Turks in Spain are recent immigrants and mainly live in Catalonia (especially in Barcelona) followed by the Community of Madrid and the Valencian Community (especially in Alicante). Smaller communities have also been formed in Andalusia and the Balearic Islands.

Organisations and associations 
Alliance of Civilizations, a forum sponsored by Turkey and Spain
Casa Turca

Notable Turks in Spain 

 Ümit Hussein, literary translator and interpreter (born in the UK; Turkish Cypriot parents) 
 Hussein Salem, businessman (born in Egypt; Turkish mother and Arab father) 
 Sercan Sararer, football player (born in Germany; Turkish father and Spanish Catalans mother)

See also 

Spain–Turkey relations
La Pasión Turca
Immigration to Spain
Turks in Europe
British Turks
Turks in France
Turks in Italy

References

External links

Spain
Spain
 
Ethnic groups in Spain
Muslim communities in Europe
Spain–Turkey relations